The 2015–16 New Hampshire Wildcats men's basketball team  represented the University of New Hampshire during the 2015–16 NCAA Division I men's basketball season. The Wildcats, led by 11th year head coach Bill Herrion, played their home games at Lundholm Gym and were members of the America East Conference. They finished the season 20–13, 11–5 in America East play to finish in a tie for third place. They defeated Binghamton in the quarterfinals of the America East tournament where they lost to Vermont. They were invited to the CollegeInsider.com Tournament where they defeated Fairfield in the first round to advance to the second round where they lost to Coastal Carolina.

Roster

Schedule

|-
!colspan=9 style="background:#191970; color:#FFFFFF;"| Non-conference regular season

|-
!colspan=9 style="background:#191970; color:#FFFFFF;"| America East regular season

|-
!colspan=9 style="background:#191970; color:#FFFFFF;"| America East tournament

|-
!colspan=9 style="background:#191970; color:#FFFFFF;"| CIT

References

New Hampshire Wildcats men's basketball seasons
New Hampshire
New Hampshire
Wildcats men's b
Wildcats